

71001–71100 

|-
| 71001 Natspasoc ||  || The National Space Society (NSS), an international space advocacy non-profit organization, was established in the United States on 1986 Mar. 8, from the merger of two space advocacy organizations, the National Space Institute, founded by Wernher von Braun, and the L5 Society, based on the concepts of Gerard K. O'Neill. || 
|}

71101–71200 

|-bgcolor=#f2f2f2
| colspan=4 align=center | 
|}

71201–71300 

|-id=282
| 71282 Holuby ||  || Jozef Ludovít Holuby (1836–1923) was a Slovak Lutheran priest, writer, revivalist, botanist and ethnographer. He obtained an honorary doctorate of natural sciences at the Faculty of Natural Sciences at Charles University in Prague in 1922. || 
|}

71301–71400 

|-bgcolor=#f2f2f2
| colspan=4 align=center | 
|}

71401–71500 

|-id=445
| 71445 Marc ||  || Marc Y. Wasserman (born 1973), son of the American astronomer Lawrence H. Wasserman who discovered this minor planet. At the time of this citation, Marc was a fellow in clinical neurophysiology at Loyola University Medical Center in Maywood, Illinois. || 
|-id=461
| 71461 Chowmeeyee ||  || Chow Mee Yee (1960–2005) was a classmate of the discoverer Bill Yeung at the Pui Ching Middle School in Hong Kong. || 
|-id=480
| 71480 Roberthatt ||  || Robert Hatt (1902–1989), Director of the Cranbrook Institute of Science in Bloomfield Hills, Michigan (1935–1967). A Fellow in the Zoological Society of London, the New York Zoological Society, and the American Museum of Natural History, his research on the mammals of the U.S. resulted in many scholarly publications. || 
|-id=482
| 71482 Jennamarie ||  || Jennifer Marie Mayhew (born 1981), a Cayuga-Canadian and wife of the discovering astronomer with the Spacewatch programme. Born in Ontario, she is now a resident in Texas and renowned for her generosity, as a teenager helped disabled children ride horses. Named by her husband of six years, though absent in the military for most of that time, to recognize all families who are separated by war. || 
|-id=483
| 71483 Dickgottfried ||  || Richard "Dick" Gottfried (born 1939) is retired from Sigma Aldrich Corp. and St. Josephs Hospital (Tucson, AZ), and is currently active with the Tucson Gem and Mineral Show. He is an amateur paleontologist with a collection that is meticulously catalogued and researched beyond the usual "amateur" quality and ability. || 
|-id=485
| 71485 Brettman ||  || Orville Brettman (born 1947) was exposed to astronomy at the age of 14. He joined the Association of Lunar & Planetary Observers and was a founding member of the Elgin Astronomical Society (Illinois). He became involved with the Astronomical League and was President of the League from 1980 to 1982. || 
|-id=489
| 71489 Dynamocamp ||  || "Dynamo Camp" is the Italian location of the Hole in the Wall Association, a non-profit organisation that works around the world to promote and operate free summer camps specially designed for children with serious and chronic illnesses. This special camp is located in the Tuscany region near the San Marcello Pistoiese Observatory.  || 
|}

71501–71600 

|-id=538
| 71538 Robertfried ||  || Robert E. Fried (1930–2003), a former airline pilot, who was inspired by Patrick Moore to build his own 16-inch telescope. Fried did professional quality photometry on variable stars from his Braeside Observatory, eventually located in Flagstaff, Arizona. He served as President of the Astronomical League from 1974 to 1975 and 1977 to 1978. || 
|-id=539
| 71539 VanZandt ||  || Rollin P. VanZandt (1911–1994), known as "Van" to most, was very active in the Astronomical League as an advocate for professional-amateur collaborations during the 1970s. || 
|-id=556
| 71556 Page ||  || Gary L. Page (born 1947) is an American physicist and astrophysicist at the George Mason University, Fairfax, Virginia, who investigates the presence and effects of non-baryonic matter in the Solar System (Src, Src). || 
|}

71601–71700 

|-id=615
| 71615 Ramakers ||  || Theo Ramakers (born 1943) is Assistant Coordinator for the Association of Lunar and Planetary Observers (ALPO) Solar Section. He has been instrumental in organizing the large database of tens of thousands of images and observations from amateur astronomers around the world, making them available on the ALPO website. || 
|-id=669
| 71669 Dodsonprince ||  || Helen Dodson Prince (1905–2002) was an astronomer known for her work on solar flares at the University of Michigan and the McMath-Hulbert Observatory. She was the Observatory's associate director and received the Annie Jump Cannon Award in 1955. || 
|}

71701–71800 

|-id=783
| 71783 Izeryna ||  || The Izera Dark Sky Park was established in the Jizera Mountains, around the border between the Czech Republic and Poland, in 2009. The name was derived from oread Izerina, a patroness of the region, and from the mineral izeryn that is a local type of ilmenite with a color resembling the darkness of the sky in the park. || 
|}

71801–71900 

|-id=885
| 71885 Denning || 2000 WD || William Frederick Denning (1848–1931) was a British amateur astronomer and renowned for his visual study of the heights and velocities of meteors and for his catalogues of meteor radiants. He also maintained an interest in Jupiter's red spot and discovered five comets, two of them of short period. || 
|}

71901–72000 

|-id=971
| 71971 Lindaketcham ||  || Linda Ketcham (born 1944) made a generous grant of land space for the construction and operation of Sugarloaf Mountain Observatory in South Deerfield, Massachusetts. || 
|}

References 

071001-072000